= Amanda Prantera =

British novelist (born 1942)

Amanda Prantera (born 23 April 1942) is a British novelist who has been living in Italy since the age of 20. She is the author of a number of novels which vary from metaphysical fantasies to contemporary thrillers set in her adopted home of Italy.

== Publications ==
- Strange Loop (1984)
- The Cabalist (1985)
- Conversations with Lord Byron on perversion, 163 years after His Lordship’s death (1986)
- The Side of the Moon (1991)
- Proto Zoë (1992)
- The Young Italians (1993)
- The Kingdom of Fanes (1995)
- Zoë Trope (1996)
- Letter to Lorenzo (1999)
- Don Giovanna (2000)
- Capri file (2001)
- Spoiler (2003)
- Sabine (2005)
- The Loft [Translator] (2011)
- Wolfsong (2012)
- Peter and the Egg (2013)
- Nowhere Ending Sky [Translator] (2013)
- Mohawk's Brood (2014)
